The year 1952 in architecture involved some significant events.

Buildings and structures

Buildings

 April – Stockwell Garage, designed by Adie, Button and Partners, with engineer A. E. Beer, is opened by London Transport.
 December 15 – The Sands Hotel, designed by Wayne McAllister, is opened on the Las Vegas Strip (demolished 30 June 1996).
 Brewster-Douglass Housing Projects, completed in the Brush Park section of Detroit, Michigan.
 Edificio Miguel E. Abed completed in Mexico City using the latest technology for earthquake engineering.
 Kotelnicheskaya Embankment apartments completed in the central Tagansky District in Moscow, and one of the "Seven Sisters".
 Lever House, designed by Gordon Bunshaft of Skidmore, Owings and Merrill, is completed at 390 Park Avenue in New York City.
 Liljestrand House in Honolulu, Hawaii, designed by Vladimir Ossipoff, is completed.
 Säynätsalo Town Hall in Finland, designed by Alvar Aalto, is completed.
 Unité d'Habitation in Marseille, designed by Le Corbusier, is completed.
 Pedregulho Housing Complex in Rio de Janeiro, designed by Affonso Eduardo Reidy, is inaugurated.
 United Nations Secretariat Building on Manhattan, designed by France's Le Corbusier and Brazil's Oscar Niemeyer, is completed.
 Dorton Arena ("Paraboleum"), Raleigh, North Carolina, designed by Matthew Nowicki (died 1950), is built.

Awards
 AIA Gold Medal – Auguste Perret.
 RIBA Royal Gold Medal – George Grey Wornum.

Births
 February 15 – Marco Piva, Italian
 July 25 – Eduardo Souto de Moura, Portuguese
 December 15 – David Marks, British (d. 2017)
 Shelley McNamara, Irish

Deaths
 December 26 – Robert Atkinson, English (born 1883)